St. Francis Xavier College (Colégio São Francisco Xavier) is a Brazilian co-educational Catholic school located in the Subprefecture of Ipiranga of the city of São Paulo.  It was founded by the Jesuits in 1928 and covers kindergarten through high school.

History and operations
Guido del Toro arrived in Brazil from Italy in 1914 and dedicated himself to the evangelization of Japanese immigrants. In 1928, he founded Japanese Catholic College of St. Francis Xavier in a rented house on Liberty Street. He received the present property in 1929 and by 1931 resituated the school there, still dedicated to serving the Japanese.

In 1950, it grew to being a primary and gymnasium. With the completion of a new building in 1966, it became a high school and took the name St. Francis Xavier College.

Rectors

 1928–1950 – Guido del Toro
 1950–1959 – Ignatius Shigeo Takenchi
 1961–1965 – Angelo Banki 
 1965–1971 – André Massao Ozaki
 1971–1977 – Fernando Maria Alvarez de Miranda
 1977–1983 – José Maria Herreros Robles
 1983–1984 – Angel López Abad
 1984–1987 – Paul Pedreira de Freitas
 1987–1988 – Luis Pecci
 1988–1992 – Roberto Villar
 1992–1999 – Nelson Lopes da Silva
 1999–2005 – Laertes J. Cargnelutti
 2005–2010 – Manuel Madruga Samaniego
 2011 – Eduardo Henriques
 2012 – Eduardo Beltramini

See also
 List of Jesuit sites

References  

1928 establishments in Brazil
Boys' schools in Brazil
Educational institutions established in 1928
Jesuit schools in Brazil
Mixed-sex education
Catholic primary schools in Brazil
Catholic secondary schools in Brazil
Private schools in Brazil
Schools in São Paulo